Whatì Airport  is located  east of Whatì, Northwest Territories, Canada.

Airlines and destinations

References

Certified airports in the North Slave Region